The ancient residential diocese of Orange in the Comtat Venaissin in Provence, a fief belonging to the Papacy, was suppressed by the French government during the French Revolution.  It was revived in 2009 as a titular see of the Roman Catholic Church.

History 

The city now called Orange in southern France was  called Arausio in Roman times.  It had been founded as a retirement colony for veterans of the Roman Army who had served under Augustus during his campaigns against Marc Antony. It became the seat of a bishop very probably towards the end of the 3rd century: at the Synod of Arles in 314, its bishop was represented by a priest named Faustinus. The first bishop of Arausio whose name is given in extant documents was Constantius, who took part in the Council of Aquileia, 381. From the early 5th century, the see was a suffragan of the metropolitan see of Arles.

Arausio hosted two important synods, in 441 and 529. The Second Council of Orange was of importance for its condemnation of what later came to be called Semipelagianism.

In 1516 Francis I of France ordered the union of the principality of Orange and the Dauphiné, the accomplishment of which was ordered by the Parliament of Grenoble in March 1517.  This union made the Bishop of Orange subject as far as his temporal rights were concerned to the king of France.  On 8 August 1520, King Francis granted Bishop Guillaume Pélissier an extra six months to make his submission to the Chambre des comptes of the Dauphiné.

In accordance with the Concordat of 1801, Pope Pius VII attached the territory of the diocese to the archdiocese of Avignon by the papal bull Qui Christi Domini of 29 November 1801. In 1817, after the fall of the Emperor Bonaparte and the return of the Bourbon monarchy, it was planned to restore the residential status of the bishopric in accordance with a new concordat, but the French parliament refused to ratify the concordat.

The ancient see of Arausio, therefore, is no longer a residential bishopric.  In January 2009 Pope Benedict XVI revived the title for use as a titular see, for auxiliary bishops of other dioceses and for curial bureaucrats to whom episcopal status is granted.  The title currently (since 27 January 2012) belongs to Archbishop Julio Murat, Apostolic Nuncio to Cameroon and to Equatorial Guinea since 2018.

Bishops

To 1000
A list of names of bishops before 347 was invented by Polycarpe de la Rivière but is unsupported by any evidence.

Faustinus in 314 attended the Council of Arles as a cleric accompanying the unnamed bishop of Orange, the first recorded bishop of Orange.
? Aristonus, 347
? Eradius, c. 356
Constantius 381
Marin, 433
Justus, c. 440-c.455
Eutropius of Orange, c. 455-475
Verus 
Florentius of Orange, 517-524
Vindemialis, 527-549
Matthieu, 555
Trapecius, 584
Salicus, 788-798
Damasus, c. 804
Boniface, c. 820-839
Laudon, c. 840
Pons I, c. 852
Gérard I, 855-c. 862
Boniface II*, 860
Oldaricus*, 866
Gérard II, 879
Bonnaricus I, 899
Ebroinus, 910
Pontius (Pons) II, 914
Bonnaricus II*, 930
Salitoneus*, 940
Ingelbertus*, 952
Richard*, 968
Segaldus*, 980
Bertrand*, 994
Aldebrand I*, 1005
Berniconius*, 1020
Aldebrand II*, 1026
Pons III*, 1032

The last ten bishops of the 10th and 11th centuries are completely unattested.

1000 to 1300

Odalric c.1040
Martin 1058
Geraldus de Asteri (Géraud) c.1060
Guillaume I c.1080-1098
Bérenger 1107-1127
Gérard 1128-1129
Guillaume II 1130-1138
Guillaume III 1139-1140
Bernard 1141-c.1170
Pierre I 1173
Hugues Florent c.1180
Arnoul 1182 - after 1204
Guillaume Elie  after 1204-1221
Amicus 1222-c.1240
Pierre II c.1240-1271
Josselin 1272-c.1278
Guillaume D'Espinouse 1281-1321

1300 to 1500

Rostaing I 1322-1324
Hugues 1324-1328
Pierre III 1329-1342
Guillaume VII 1343-1348
Jean de Revol 1349-1350
Guillaume VIII 1350-1351
François de Caritat 1373-1387
Pierre Didaci 1389-1413
Pierre D'Ailly 1413-1417 (Administrator) (resigned)
Georges de Grano 1418-1420
Guillaume IX 1420-1428 (transferred to Cassano in s. Italy)
Guillaume X 1429-v.1447
Bertrand III 1438-v.1442
Antoine Ferrier v.1444-1450
Jean Payer 1454-1466
Guyot Adhémar 1466-1468
Jean Gobert 1468-1476
Pierre de Surville 1476-1480
Laurent Alleman 1481-1483
Pierre Carré, O.P. 1483-1510

1500 to 1790

Guillaume Pélissier 1510-1527
Louis Pélissier 1527-1542
Rostaing de La Baume de Suze, O.Cist. 1543-1560
Philippe de La Chambre de Maurienne, O.S.B. 1560-1572 (resigned)
Jean de Tulles I 1572-1608
Jean de Tulles II 1608-1640
Jean Vincent de Tulles 1640-1647 (transferred to Lavaure)
Hyacinthe Serroni 1647-1661 (transferred to Mende)
Alexandre Fabri 1661-1674
Jean-Jacques D`Obheil 1677-1720
Louis Chomel 1720-1731
François-André de Tilly 1731-1774
Guillaume-Louis du Tillet 1774-1790, last bishop

See also
Catholic Church in France
List of Catholic dioceses in France

Notes

Bibliography

Reference works
 pp. 591–592. (Use with caution; obsolete)
  (in Latin) p. 117-118.
 (in Latin) p. 119.
 p. 123.
 p. 102.
 p. 106.
 p. 107.

Studies

 second edition (in French)

Orange
1801 disestablishments in France
Vaucluse